The silky anteater, also known as the pygmy anteater, has traditionally been considered a single species of anteater, Cyclopes didactylus, in the genus Cyclopes, the only living genus in the family Cyclopedidae. Found in southern Mexico, and Central and South America, it is the smallest of all known anteaters. It has nocturnal habits and appears to be completely arboreal; its hind feet are highly modified for climbing.

A taxonomic review in 2017, including both molecular and morphological evidence, found that Cyclopes may actually comprise at least seven species. The only known extinct cyclopedid species is Palaeomyrmidon incomtus, from the Late Miocene (c. 7 to 9 million years ago) of modern-day Argentina.

Description
Silky anteaters are the smallest living anteaters and have proportionately shorter faces and larger crania than other species. They have dense and soft fur, which ranges from grey to yellowish in color, with a silvery sheen. Many subspecies have darker, often brownish, streaks, and paler underparts or limbs. The eyes are black, and the soles of his feet are red.

The scientific name translates roughly as "two-toed circle-foot", and refers to the presence of two claws on the fore feet, and their ability to almost encircle a branch to which the animal is clinging. The claws are present on the second and third toes, with the latter being much larger. The fourth toe is very small, and lacks a claw, while the other two toes are vestigial or absent, and are not visible externally. The hind feet have four toes of equal length, each with long claws, and a vestigial hallux that is not externally visible. The ribs are broad and flat, overlapping to form an internal armored casing that protects the chest.

They have partially prehensile tails.

Distribution and habitat
Silky anteaters are found from Oaxaca and southern Veracruz in Mexico, through Central America (except El Salvador), and south to Ecuador, and northern Peru, Bolivia, and Brazil. A distinct population is found in the northern Atlantic Forest of eastern Brazil. Silky anteaters are also found on the island of Trinidad.

Systematics
Silky anteaters form the sister clade to the myrmecophagid anteaters, together forming Vermilingua. Vermilingua is a sister clade to sloths (Folivora), together forming Pilosa.

Until a detailed taxonomic review in 2017, seven subspecies of C. didactylus were recognized.
 C. d. didactylus Linnaeus, 1758 - the Guyanas, eastern Venezuela, Trinidad, Atlantic Forest
 C. d. catellus Thomas, 1928 - northern Bolivia, southeastern Peru, western Brazil
 C. d. dorsalis Gray, 1865 - extreme southern Mexico, Central America, northern Colombia
 C. d. eva Thomas, 1902 - western Ecuador, southwestern Colombia
 C. d. ida, Thomas, 1900 - western Brazil, eastern Ecuador and Peru
 C. d. melini Lönnberg, 1928 - northern Brazil, eastern Colombia
 C. d. mexicanus Hollister, 1914 - southern Mexico

The 2017 review suggests that four of these subspecies deserve to be recognized as species, while the others are synonyms. It also described three new species of silky anteater.
 C. didactylus (Linnaeus, 1758) (synonym: C. d. melini) - the Guyanas, eastern Venezuela, Trinidad, Atlantic Forest and northern Brazil
 C. catellus Thomas, 1928 - Bolivia
 C. dorsalis (Gray, 1865) (synonyms: C. d. eva and C. d. mexicanus) - western Ecuador, southwestern to northern Colombia, Central America, southern Mexico
 C. ida Thomas, 1900 - western Brazil, eastern Ecuador, eastern Colombia and Peru
 C. thomasi Miranda et al., 2017 - Central Peru, extreme western Brazil (Acre)
 C. rufus Miranda et al., 2017 - Brazil (Rondônia)
 C. xinguensis Miranda et al., 2017 - Brazil, between the Madeira River and the Xingu River (Below the Amazon river)

Behavior

Silky anteaters are nocturnal and arboreal, found in lowland rainforests with continuous canopy, where they can move to different places without the need to descend from trees. They can occur at fairly high densities of 0.77 individuals/ha, for example, in some areas. Females have smaller home ranges than males.

The silky anteater is a slow-moving animal and feeds mainly on ants, eating between 700 and 5,000 a day. Silky anteaters also feed on wasps and wasp pupae, attacking the wasp nests at night when the wasps are sluggish and unable to defend themselves. Sometimes, it also feeds on other insects, such as termites and small coccinellid beetles. It has been observed to consume fruits while in captivity. The silky anteater defecates once a day. Some of those faeces contain a large quantity of exoskeleton fragments of insects, indicating the silky anteater does not possess either chitinase or chitobiase, digestive enzymes found in insectivorous bats.

It is a solitary animal and gives birth to a single young, up to twice a year. The young are born already furred, and with a similar colour pattern to the adults. They begin to take solid food when they are about one-third of the adult mass. The young is usually placed inside a nest of dead leaves built in tree holes, and left for about eight hours each night.

Some authors suggest the silky anteater usually dwells in silk cotton trees (genus Ceiba). Because of its resemblance to the seed pod fibers of these trees, it can use the trees as camouflage and avoid attacks of predators such as hawks and, especially, harpy eagles. During the day, they typically sleep curled up in a ball. Although they are rarely seen in the forest, they can be found more easily when they are foraging on lianas at night.

When threatened, the silky anteater, like other anteaters, defends itself by standing on its hind legs and holding its fore feet close to its face so it can strike any animal that tries to get close with its sharp claws.

The silky anteater is a host of the acanthocephalan intestinal parasite Gigantorhynchus echinodiscus.

References

Other sources
 
 Eisenberg, J.F. and Redford, K.H. 1999. "Mammals of the Neotropics, Volume 3: The Central Neotropics: Ecuador, Peru, Bolivia, Brazil". University of Chicago Press.

Anteaters
Mammals of Central America
Mammals of the Caribbean
Mammals of Bolivia
Mammals of Brazil
Mammals of Colombia
Mammals of Ecuador
Mammals of French Guiana
Mammals of Guyana
Mammals of Mexico
Mammals of Peru
Mammals of Suriname
Mammals of Trinidad and Tobago
Mammals of Venezuela
Fauna of the Amazon
Silky anteater
Silky anteater